Aran is a village and municipality in the Tovuz district of Azerbaijan. As of the year 2009, It has a population of 534.

Toponymy 
The village is known as Aran Yanıqlı among the local population. In the past, this region was an area of arable lands under Yanıqlı. Following the Second World War, people who left Yanıqlı built a new settlement here.

Demographics

Healthcare 
Aran Medical Center is located in the village.

Notable people 

 Vasif Heydərov, a lieutenant and a martyr of Second Nagorno-Karabakh War

See also 

 Administrative divisions of Azerbaijan

References

Populated places in Tovuz District